WKNG (branded as King Country) is a daytime operation only AM radio and FM radio station that is located in Tallapoosa, Georgia. The station broadcasts a Classic Country format and focuses on local programming within the West Georgia and East Alabama area. WKNG airs national and world news updates from Fox News, state news from the Georgia News Network, and local news that comes from sister station WLBB. Local programs featured are Tradeline, a call-in show for people to buy, swap, sell, trade or give away items; Petline, for people who are selling, buying or looking for animals or to locate a lost animal or finding an animal and wanting to find its owner. Community calendar events are announced every hour along with weather updates.

WKNG covers from Atlanta, Georgia to Birmingham, Alabama and Chattanooga, Tennessee to Columbus, Georgia with a 50,000 watt signal. The station lowers its power to 5,000-watts two hours before signing off for the day at night each month.

References

External links

KNG
Country radio stations in the United States
Radio stations established in 1977
1977 establishments in Georgia (U.S. state)
KNG